Joshua Anthony Kelly (born 19 December 1998) is an English professional footballer who plays as a forward for Solihull Moors.

Career

Club
Kelly started his career in the youth team at Ascot United before joining Windsor in 2014 aged 15. He made his first team debut as a 16 year old in February 2015. 

In summer 2015, Kelly joined the under-18 team at Maidenhead United. He made his first team debut in October 2016 before moving out on loan to Chalfont St Peter later that season. In 2017-18, Kelly spent the entire season on loan at Walton Casuals, where he was the club's top scorer with 39 goals. Kelly returned to Maidenhead in summer 2018 and began to feature much more frequently in the first team across the next two seasons. He initially left the club at the end of the 2019-20 season with the intention of joining an English Football League club, but no move materialised and he returned to the Magpies ahead of the new campaign. In the 2021-22 season he reached double figures in a National League season for the first time and won the golden boot, manager's player, and player's player awards at the end of the season.

On 22 July 2022, Kelly signed a three-year deal at Solihull Moors, joining for an undisclosed fee.

International
In March 2019, Kelly was called up to the Northern Ireland U21 squad for two friendly matches in Marbella, playing in matches against Bulgaria U21 and Mexico U21. The Irish Football Association were not sure of Kelly's eligibility when these matches were played, and it later transpired that he was not eligible to play for Northern Ireland.

Career statistics

References

1998 births
Living people
English footballers
Northern Ireland youth international footballers
Ascot United F.C. players
Windsor F.C. players
Maidenhead United F.C. players
Chalfont St Peter A.F.C. players
Walton Casuals F.C. players
Solihull Moors F.C. players
National League (English football) players
Isthmian League players
Southern Football League players
Association football forwards